Federal Route 114, or Jalan Teluk Burau, Jalan Kuala Periang and Jalan Padang Matsirat (formerly Kedah state route K18 on Jalan Padang Matsirat side), is a major federal road in Langkawi Island, Kedah, Malaysia

Features

At most sections, the Federal Route 114 was built under the JKR R5 road standard, with a speed limit of 90 km/h.

List of junctions and town

References

Malaysian Federal Roads